Horst Krasser (born 14 January 1941) is an Austrian sports shooter. He competed in two events at the 1988 Summer Olympics.

References

1941 births
Living people
Austrian male sport shooters
Olympic shooters of Austria
Shooters at the 1988 Summer Olympics
Sportspeople from Graz